Almost 18 is a 2012 Finnish film. It is the first feature film by director Maarit Lalli who also wrote the screenplay with her son Henrik Mäki-Tanila, one of the main actors in the film.

Plot

Kohta 18 tells six stories of five teenage boys on the edge of adulthood. Karri, Pete, André, Akseli and Joni are dealing with same issues as every other young man; fears and hopes for future, disillusions and problems with parents. Henrik Mäki-Tanila has said that some parts of the stories are taken from his own experiences as a teenager, as well as from the lives of his friends.

Reception

The film has received mixed to positive reviews. Some critics have not been impressed by the work of mostly amateur cast, while others have complimented Lalli for creating a genuinely honest and authentic portrait of what it is to be a young adult in Finland in 2012.

Harri Närhi of City noticed that the filmmakers are in love with their characters and are therefore making the viewer feel the same way. Tarmo Poussu of Ilta-Sanomat was more reserved, writing that while the film is creating believable situations, it fails to expand them into stories.

On 3 February 2012, Kohta 18 received three Jussi Awards; for best film, best director and best screenplay.

Cast 

Karim Al-Rifai as André  
Arttu Lähteenmäki as Akseli  
Henrik Mäki-Tanila as Karri  
Anton Thompson Coon as Pete  
Ben Thompson Coon as Joni  
Elina Knihtilä as Karri's mother  
Ilari Johansson as Akseli's father  
Niina Nurminen as Joni's mother  
Mats Långbacka as Joni's stepfather 
Mari Perankoski as André's mother  
Hannu-Pekka Björkman as Pete's father 
Tarja Heinula as Pete's mother

References

Finnish drama films
2012 films
2010s Finnish-language films